The IWRG Intercontinental Heavyweight Championship (Campeon Intercontinental Peso Completo IWRG in Spanish) is a singles Championship in the Mexican lucha libre (Professional wrestling) promotion International Wrestling Revolution Group (IWRG) and was introduced in 1997. It has since been defended throughout Mexico, primarily in Naucalpan, but also in Japan as well. As the Championship is designated as a heavyweight title, it can only officially be competed for by wrestlers weighing at least .

The current champion is El Hijo del Espectro Jr., who defeated Gianni Valletta for the championship on September 16, 2021. The first holder of the IWRG Intercontinental Heavyweight Championship was Pierroth Jr. who won the title on September 28, 1997 defeating Black Magic in the finals of an eight-man tournament. There have been eighteen recognized champions, combining for twenty-five total reigns. Máscara Año 2000 Jr. and Scorpio Jr. are tied for most championship reigns, with four each. El Canek holds the record for the longest individual reign 1,444 days (from May 5, 2006 to  April 18, 2010, although his reign had a long period of inactivity). Valletta's first reign lasted 11 days, the shortest of any champion. Scorpio Jr.'s four reigns combined to at least 4,987 days, almost quadrupling El Canek.

As it is a professional wrestling championship, the championship was not won not by actual competition, but by a scripted ending to a match determined by the bookers and match makers. On occasion the promotion declares a championship vacant, which means there is no champion at that point in time. This can either be due to a storyline, or real life issues such as a champion suffering an injury being unable to defend the championship, or leaving the company.

Title history

Combined reigns

Footnotes

References

External links
wrestling-titles.com
Solie.org
Cagematch.net

Heavyweight wrestling championships
International Wrestling Revolution Group championships
Intercontinental professional wrestling championships